Joel Mokyr (born 26 July 1946) is a Netherlands-born American-Israeli economic historian. He is a professor of economics and history at Northwestern University, where he has taught since 1974; in 1994 he was named the Robert H. Strotz Professor of Arts and Sciences. He is also a Sackler Professorial Fellow at the University of Tel Aviv's Eitan Berglas School of Economics.

Early life and education
Mokyr was born in Leiden, Netherlands. His father, a civil servant, and his mother were Dutch Jews who survived the Holocaust. His father died of cancer when Mokyr was one year old, so he was raised by his mother in Haifa, Israel.

Mokyr earned a B.A. in economics and history from the Hebrew University of Jerusalem in 1968. He earned an M.Phil. in economics in 1972 and a Ph.D. in economics in 1974, both from Yale University. His dissertation was about "Industrial Growth and Stagnation in the Low Countries, 1800-1850" and was supervised by William N. Parker.

Career
After completing his Ph.D. at Yale University, Mokyr began working at Northwestern University in 1974. Since then, he has been chair or co-chair for over 50 doctoral student theses.  A former editor of the Journal of Economic History and president of the Economic History Association, he served as the editor-in-chief of the Oxford Encyclopedia of Economic History.

He continues to serve as editor-in-chief of a book series published by Princeton University Press, The Princeton University Press Economic History of the Western World. A former chair of the Economics Department and President of the Economic History Association, he is a member of the American Academy of Arts and Sciences and a number of comparable institutions in Europe. He also serves as editor of the Essays in Economic & Business History.

He became a foreign member of the Royal Netherlands Academy of Arts and Sciences in 2001.  In 2006, he was awarded the biennial Heineken Award for History by the Royal Netherlands Academy of Arts and Sciences. He won the 2015 Balzan International Prize for economic history.

Research

Industrial Revolution
Mokyr posits that the Industrial Revolution was the result of culture and institutions. He argues that the root of modernity is in "the emergence of a belief in the usefulness of progress", and that "it was a turning point when intellectuals started to conceive of knowledge as cumulative".

Mokyr furthermore argues that political fragmentation (the presence of a large number of European states) made it possible for heterodox ideas to thrive, as entrepreneurs, innovators, ideologues, and heretics could easily flee to a neighbouring state in the event that the one state would try to suppress their ideas and activities. This is what set Europe apart from the technologically advanced, large unitary empires such as China and India. China had both a printing press and movable type, and India had similar levels of scientific and technological achievement as Europe in 1700, yet the Industrial Revolution would occur in Europe, not China or India. In Europe, political fragmentation was coupled with an "integrated market for ideas" where Europe's intellectuals used the lingua franca of Latin, had a shared intellectual basis in Europe's classical heritage and the pan-European institution of the Republic of Letters.

A Culture of Growth
Mokyr presents his explanations for the Industrial Revolution in the 2016 book A Culture of Growth: The Origins of the Modern Economy. The book has received positive reviews. Deirdre McCloskey described it as a "brilliant book...  It’s long, but consistently interesting, even witty. It sustains interest right down to page 337... The book is not beach reading. But you will finish it impressively learned about how we got to where we are in the modern world." In her review, McCloskey furthermore lauded Mokyr as a "Nobel-worthy economic scientist".

In a review published in Nature, Brad DeLong found that while he favored other explanations for the Industrial Revolution, "I would not be greatly surprised if I were wrong, and Mokyr's brief...turned out to be the most broadly correct analysis...A Culture of Growth is certainly making me rethink."

Cambridge economic historian Victoria Bateman wrote, "In pointing to growth-boosting factors that go beyond either the state or the market, Mokyr's book is very welcome. It could also feed into discussions about the scientific community post-Brexit. By reviving the focus on culture it will, however, prove controversial, particularly among economists." However, a fine definitional distinction is to be considered between the ″culture as ideas, socially learned" and ″culture as inheritance transmitted genetically". This Economist article makes the distinction clear. The book has also been reviewed favorably by Diane Coyle, Peer Vries, Mark Koyama, Enrico Spolaore, and The Economist. Geoffrey Hodgson criticized the book for placing "too much explanatory weight" on "too few extraordinary people."

Resistance to new technologies
Mokyr outlined three reasons why societies resist new technologies:
 Incumbents who fear a threat to their power and economic rents
 Concern about broader social and political repercussions ("unintended ripple effects")
 Risk and loss aversion: new technologies often have "unanticipated and unknowable consequences"

"These three motives often merge and create powerful forces that use political power and persuasion to thwart innovations. As a result, technological progress does not follow a linear and neat trajectory. It is, as social constructionists have been trying to tell us for decades, a profoundly political process."

Quotes
 "Being teleological is the second worst thing you can be as a Historian. The worst is being Eurocentric."

Works

Books:
 1976: Industrialization in the Low Countries, 1795–1850
 1983: Why Ireland Starved: An Analytical and Quantitative Study of Irish Poverty, 1800–1851
 1985: The Economics of the Industrial Revolution (ed.)
 1990: Twenty Five Centuries of Technological Change: An Historical Survey
 1990: The Lever of Riches: Technological Creativity and Economic Progress
 Review article: "The Great Conundrum", The Journal of Modern History Vol 62, No. 1, March 1990
 1991: The Vital One: Essays in Honor of Jonathan Hughes (ed.)
 1993: The British Industrial Revolution: an Economic Perspective (ed.)
 2002: The Gifts of Athena: Historical Origins of the Knowledge Economy
 2003: The Oxford University Press Encyclopedia of Economic History (Editor in chief)
 2009: The Invention of Enterprise: Entrepreneurship from Ancient Mesopotamia to Modern Times (Co-editor)
 2009: The Enlightened Economy: An Economic History of Britain 1700–1850
 2010: The Birth of Modern Europe: Culture and Economy, 1400–1800: Essay in Honor of Jan de Vries(co-editor with Laura Cruz)
 2016: A Culture of Growth: The Origins of the Modern Economy
 2017: Economics in the Test of Time: Issues in Economic History (with Amira Ofer), in Hebrew, 2 volumes.
 TBA: Why Britain? A new view of the Industrial Revolution. With Morgan Kelly and Cormac Ó Gráda
 TBA: Two Paths to Prosperity: Culture and Institutions in Europe and China, 1200-2000. With Avner Greif and Guido Tabellini

References

External links

 Profile, Northwestern.edu; accessed 21 January 2016.

1946 births
Living people
Economic historians
21st-century American economists
20th-century American economists
Dutch Jews
American people of Dutch-Jewish descent
Jewish American historians
Yale University alumni
Northwestern University faculty
Fellows of the American Academy of Arts and Sciences
Members of the Royal Netherlands Academy of Arts and Sciences
People from Leiden
Winners of the Heineken Prize
Fellows of the Econometric Society
Historians of Ireland
Corresponding Fellows of the British Academy
Presidents of the Economic History Association